USS Cochino (SS-345) was a  submarine in service with the United States Navy from 1945 to 1949. She sank after a battery explosion off Norway, on 26 August 1949. Cochino was named for the cochino, a triggerfish found in the Atlantic.

Construction
Cochino was laid down by the Electric Boat Company, of Groton, Connecticut, on 13 April 1944. She was launched on 20 April 1945, sponsored by Mrs. M.E. Serat, the wife of the Assistant to the President of Electric Boat Co., and commissioned on 25 August 1945.

Service history
During her shakedown cruise out of New London, Connecticut, Cochino visited Newport, Rhode Island, 12–15 September 1945, then sailed for the Panama Canal Zone, on 3 October. Reaching her destination on 9 October, the new fleet boat carried out training with the Operational Development Force, then visited Miami, Florida, 24–30 October, to observe Navy Day. She then proceeded to Guantanamo Bay, Cuba, where Cochino operated in until 27 November, when she shaped a course back to New London.

Cochino provided services out of Naval Operating Base, Guantanamo, for much of January, clearing those waters on 25 January' for her new home port of Key West, Florida, arriving there on 27 January, after which time she returned to Guantanamo Bay, to resume providing services in that area from 24 February–7 March. In-port periods at Key West followed, 9 March–3 May and 7–10 May, punctuated by a call at St. Petersburg, Florida, 4–6 May, before she returned to Cuban waters 12–16 May. Then, following a visit to St. Thomas, Virgin Islands, 18–20 May, Cochino sailed to conduct simulated attacks upon ships of the 8th Fleet, proceeding then to Key West, upon conclusion of those evolutions.

Following a period of upkeep from 24 May–16 August 1946, Cochino operated briefly out of Guantanamo Bay, 18–24 August, before she returned to her home port. Returning to Key West, upon completion of that port call, Cochino returned to Guantanamo Bay, for another stint of providing services for fleet units in those waters, from 6–10 October. The boat operated out of Key West, for the remainder of the year, punctuating that time with visits to Havana, Cuba, from 18–21 October, and New Orleans, from 25–29 October, and providing services for the fleet out of Guantanamo Bay, from 1–6 December.

Following another in port period at Key West, from 17–29 March, Cochino headed north for a period of repairs and alterations at the Philadelphia Naval Shipyard. While there, she suffered slight damage when undocking from the marine railway on 20 May. Cochino then proceeded to Norfolk, Virginia, from 6–12 July, reporting for duty to Commander, Aircraft, Atlantic Fleet, and then shifted to Annapolis, Maryland, from 12–25 July, reporting for duty to the Superintendent of the Naval Academy, upon arrival there. She then returned to her home port for upkeep from 28 July–29 August, after which time she visited Havana, from 29 August–1 September. She returned to Key West, on 1 October, where she remained for most of the month, heading out to sea on 11 October, to ride out a storm, returning the following day.

After visiting Miami, from 25–28 October 1947, Cochino operated with the 2nd Task Fleet near Bermuda, through mid-November, after which time she returned to her homeport for upkeep through mid-January 1948. Work in the Key West operating area or upkeep in port involved the boat until 31 January, when she sailed for New Orleans, for Mardi Gras festivities, from 2–11 February. She then returned to Key West, and the local operating areas there, the fleet boat worked in those areas into the spring of 1948. Toward the end of that period, on 26 April 1948, while conducting a submerged exercise at a  depth, Cochino collided with the fleet tug . Attempts to go deep and swing the ship proved unsuccessful, and the boat suffered damage to the periscope shears, both periscopes, and her radar antenna.

Cochino then underwent repairs and major renovations at her builders' yard beginning on 11 May 1948. Converted to a GUPPY/Snorkel boat at Groton, she emerged from the yard on 4 February 1949. Departing New London, on 25 March, the newly modernized submarine visited Boston, from 26–27 March, then returned to New London, from 28 March–2 May, after which time she headed south to return to her home port, arriving at Key West, on 8 May. She then again shaped a course for New London, where she remained from 19 May until 16 July, then proceeded to Argentia, Newfoundland, where she arrived on 22 July, en route to the British Isles and her first deployment to European waters.

She reached Derry, Northern Ireland, on 29 July. She operated locally in those waters for a brief period, then put in to Derry, from 4–8 August, before visiting Portsmouth, England, from 8–12 August. She then put to sea for operations above the Arctic Circle in the Barents Sea before turning for home in late August.

In August 1949, Cochino and  sailed along the Kola Peninsula to determine whether the Soviet Union had detonated an atomic bomb.

On 25 August 1949, Cochino ran into a violent polar storm off Norway. The huge waves slammed the submarines' snorkel so violently, and jolted the boat so severely, that the pounding caused an electrical fire and battery explosion, followed by the release of deadly hydrogen gas. Defying the most wretched weather conditions, men of Cochino and Tusk fought to save the submarine for 14 hours, performing acts of skillful seamanship and high courage in the storm-lashed, frozen seas. Cochinos only fatality was a Bureau of Ships technician, Robert W. Philo, swept overboard by an icy wave. Tusk lost six of her own men by the same cause in the attempt to save Cochino.

Cochino was stricken from the List of Naval Vessels on 27 October 1949.

Cochino is one of four United States Navy submarines to be lost since the end of World War II.

References

Bibliography

External links

On Eternal Patrol: USS Cochino
USS COCHINO (SS-345) and USS TUSK (SS-426)

Explosions in 1949
Ships sunk by non-combat internal explosions
Balao-class submarines
Cold War submarines of the United States
United States submarine accidents
Lost submarines of the United States
Maritime incidents in 1949
Shipwrecks in the Norwegian Sea
Ships built in Groton, Connecticut
1945 ships